Eustachio Manfredi (20 September 1674 – 15 February 1739) was an Italian mathematician, astronomer and poet.

Biography

Eustachio Manfredi was born in Bologna on 20 September 1674.
He attended Jesuit school, then studied at the University of Bologna, graduating with a degree in law in 1691. 
At the same time he devoted himself to scientific studies in mathematics and astronomy, and to literature.

Manfredi founded the Accademia degli Inquieti (Academy of Unquiet) in Bologna around 1690 as a place where scientific topics could be discussed.
At first, the Academy held its meetings in Manfredi's house.
After four years it moved to Jacopo Sandri's house, which had more space, and in 1705 moved again to the palazzo of Conte Luigi Ferdinando Marsigli.
The Accademia delle Scienze dell'Istituto di Bologna was formally inaugurated in 1714, 
and the Accademia degli Inquieti merged into it.

In 1698 Manfredi obtained the chair of mathematics at the University of Bologna.
In 1704 he was named "Superintendent of the waters of Bologna", and was also made head of the college of Montalto, which educated young men destined for a clerical career.
In 1711 he became director of the Astronomical Observatory of Bologna, a position he held until his death.
He was a member of the French Academy of Sciences in Paris from 1726 and of the Royal Society of London from 1729.
He died in Bologna on 15 February 1739.

Scientific work

Manfredi's scientific work was impressive. 
On 29 November 1707 Manfredi and Vittorio Francesco Stancari discovered the comet C/1707 W1. 
Among his scientific works are Ephemerides motuum coelestium (1715–1725), De transitu Mercurii per solem anno 1723 (1724), De gnomone meridiano bononiensi (1736) and Instituzioni astronomiche (1749), a posthumous work.

The asteroid 13225 Manfredi was named in honour of Eustachio Manfredi and his two brothers Gabriele Manfredi and Eraclito Manfredi.
Eustachio Manfredi provided "the first demonstration, though unsought, of the revolution of the Earth around the Sun, and thus the reality of a heliocentric system".
As a result of this discovery, the Church admitted the scientific nature of Galilean system and removed from the index many works of Galileo Galilei.

Literary work

Manfredi was also a well known poet in his day. 
He was a member of the Academy of Arcadia with the name of "Aci Delpusiano".
The Rime of Manfredi was issued in 1713 and then published in the final edition posthumously in 1748 by his friend Giampietro Zanotti.
It is generally about events of the period (births, marriages, deaths, etc.), according to the peculiar character of the Arcadian poetry, 
and is often weighed down by emphasis and intellectualism. 
His poetic vein shows itself in a group of poems called "for a nun," inspired by the closure of the convent of Giulia Caterina Vandi, 
a girl of Bologna with whom Manfredi had fallen in love. 
This group includes the song "Woman, they are your eyes", considered his masterpiece, and numerous sonnets in the style of Petrarch.

Bibliography

Notes and references
Citations

Sources

Further reading
 Francesco Ambrosoli, Manuale della letteratura italiana, Milano: per Antonio Fontana, 1832, vol. IV pp. 305–313.
 Bruno Maier, "Manfredi, Eustachio", in Vittore Branca, Dizionario critico della letteratura italiana, Torino: UTET, 1973, vol. 2, p. 480–4.
 Gian Pietro Zanotti Cavazzoni, "Ritratto di Eustachio Manfredi" in Francesco Ambrosoli, Manuale della letteratura italiana, Milano: per Antonio Fontana, 1832, vol. IV pp. 477–81 

External links
 Archivio storico – Università di Bologna

1674 births
1739 deaths
Scientists from Bologna
Academic staff of the University of Bologna
18th-century Italian astronomers
18th-century Italian mathematicians
Members of the French Academy of Sciences
18th-century Italian poets
Italian male poets
Fellows of the Royal Society